Reed Sheppard is an American basketball player who currently attends North Laurel High School.

Early life and high school
Sheppard grew up in London, Kentucky and attended North Laurel High School. He became North Laurel's starting shooting guard as a freshman and averaged 20.6 points per game. Sheppard led the state of Kentucky in scoring during his sophomore season after averaging 30.1 points in 28 games played. He was named the Kentucky Gatorade of Player of the Year as a junior after averaging 25.5 points, 7.6 assists, 6.8 rebounds, and 4.4 steals per game. Sheppard was selected to play in the 2023 McDonald's All-American Boys Game during his senior year. He was named Kentucky Mr. Basketball after averaging 22.5 points, 8.5 assists, and 8.4 rebounds per game. Sheppard finished his high school career with 3,727 points, 1,214 assists, and 1,050 rebounds.

Recruiting
Sheppard is considered a top-50 prospect in the 2023 class. He committed to play college basketball at Kentucky over offers Louisville and Virginia.

Personal life
Sheppard's father, Jeff Sheppard, played college basketball at Kentucky and was the Most Outstanding Player of the 1998 NCAA tournament and later played in the National Basketball Association for the Atlanta Hawks. His mother, Stacey, also played basketball at Kentucky and scored over 1,400 career points. Sheppard's older sister, Madison, played college basketball at Campbellsville University.

References

Living people
American men's basketball players
Basketball players from Kentucky
Shooting guards
People from London, Kentucky